Members of the cabinet of the President Ernesto Zedillo (1994–2000).

List

Sources 

Cabinet of Mexico
1994 establishments in Mexico
2000 disestablishments in Mexico
Cabinets established in 1994
Cabinets disestablished in 2000